The Empire of Japan competed at the 1936 Summer Olympics in Berlin, Germany. 179 athletes competed in 13 sports and also participated in art competitions. In art competitions, Japan won 2 bronze medals by Ryuji Fujita in paintings and also Sujaku Suzuki in drawing and water colours. As the country hosted the next Olympics that was supposed to be held Tokyo before cancellation, a Japanese segment was performed at the closing ceremony.

Medalists

| width=78% align=left valign=top |

| width=22% align=left valign=top |

Athletics

Aquatics

Swimming

Diving

Water polo

Elimination rounds  

In the first round each team in a group played each other team in the same group. The placings were determined on points. If the points were equal, then the better goal average decided. The first two teams of each group were qualified for the semi-finals, while the third and fourth placed team was eliminated. 

Group 3

Place:14th

Basketball
First Round

Second Round

Third Round

Equestrian

Football

Round of 16

Quarter-finals

Field hockey

Group A

Gymnastics

Rowing

Japan had 16 rowers participate in three out of seven rowing events in 1936.

 Men's coxed pair
 Tsutomu Mitsudome
 Osamu Abe
 Taro Teshima (cox)

 Men's coxed four
 Chikara Shirasaka
 Taichi Yamada
 Takashi Hatakeyama
 Yoichi Endo
 Taro Teshima (cox)

 Men's eight
 Tadashi Negishi
 Masaru Kashiwahara
 Shusui Sekigawa
 Isamu Mita
 Osamu Kitamura
 Haruyoshi Nakagawa
 Takeo Hori
 Yoshiteru Suzuki
 Tadashi Shimijima (cox)

Sailing

Japan had 3 rowers participate in 2 out of four Sailing events in 1936.

 O-Jolle
 Norio Fujimura
 Star
 Minoru Takarabe
 Takuo Mitsui

Swimming

Wrestling

Art competitions

References

External links
Official Olympic Reports
International Olympic Committee results database

Nations at the 1936 Summer Olympics
1936
Summer Olympics